DNA-directed RNA polymerase II subunit RPB2 is an enzyme that in humans is encoded by the POLR2B gene.

This gene encodes the second largest subunit of RNA polymerase II, the polymerase responsible for synthesizing messenger RNA in eukaryotes. This subunit, in combination with at least two other polymerase subunits, forms a structure within the polymerase that maintains contact in the active site of the enzyme between the DNA template and the newly synthesized RNA.

Interactions
POLR2B has been shown to interact with POLR2C, POLR2E, POLR2H and POLR2L.

References

Further reading